Britton Wilson (born 13 November 2000) is  an American track and field athlete specializing in the 400 meters hurdles and 400 meters. She finished fifth in the 400 m hurdles at the 2022 World Athletics Championships, her major championship debut. Wilson is the North American indoor record holder for the 400 m dash with a time of 49.48 seconds, set on March 11, 2023 in Albuquerque.

She is a three-time NCAA champion.

Career
Initially a student at the University of Tennessee, Wilson switched to University of Arkansas in 2021 after suffering mental health issues. The change to Arkansas proved a catalyst to her most successful season as she won the 400 meters hurdles at the NCAA outdoor in June 2022 representing the Arkansas Razorbacks in a time of 53.86, finishing nearly a whole second ahead of second-placed Anna Hall. Prior to this Wilson had won both the 400 m hurdles and 400 m dash at the SEC championship as well as claimed a medal in the 4 x 400 m relay which included a split time of 48.60, the fastest ever single lap in college history.

She finished second in the 400 m hurdles to world record holder Sydney McLaughlin at the 2022 USATF Outdoor Championships as McLaughlin broke her own world record. Wilson ran a personal best time of 53.08 as runner up. She was named in the American squad for the 2022 World Athletics Championships, where she placed fifth in the final in a time of 54.02 s.

On March 11, 2023 at the NCCA Indoors in Albuquerque, New Mexico (at altitude), Wilson broke the collegiate and North American indoor records in the 400 m flat by over half a second with the second-fastest mark on the respective world all-time list of 49.48 seconds, a time that would have been a world indoor record before February 19 when Femke Bol achieved 49.26 s. Wilson's mark was also faster than the collegiate outdoor record. She added title for the 4 x 400 m relay with a 49.20 s anchor, the fastest indoor split in world history.

Achievements

International competitions

NCAA titles
 NCAA Division I Women's Outdoor Track and Field Championships
 400 m hurdles: 2022
 NCAA Division I Women's Indoor Track and Field Championships
 400 meters: 2023
 4 × 400 m relay: 2023

References

External links
 
 Arkansas Razorbacks bio
 Tennessee Volunteers bio

2000 births
Living people
World Athletics Championships athletes for the United States
Arkansas Razorbacks women's track and field athletes
Tennessee Volunteers women's track and field athletes
American female hurdlers
21st-century American women
World Athletics Championships medalists
World Athletics Championships winners